Terror After Midnight is a 1962 German drama film directed by Jürgen Goslar and starring Christine Kaufmann, Martin Held, and Hilde Krahl. In this film, a gangster kidnaps a teenage girl and holds her to ransom. It is based on the novel The Hours After Midnight by Joseph Hayes.

The film's sets were designed by the art director Wolf Englert.

Cast

References

External links

1962 films
West German films
1960s thriller drama films
1960s German-language films
Films set in the United States
Films based on American novels
Films based on thriller novels
Films about child abduction
German thriller drama films
Constantin Film films
1962 drama films
1960s German films